J. K. "Jack" Chambers (born 12 July 1938 in Grimsby, Ontario) is a Canadian linguist, and a well-known expert on language variation and change, who has played an important role in research on Canadian English since the 1980s; he has coined the terms "Canadian Raising" and "Canadian Dainty", the latter used for Canadian speech that mimics the British, popular till the mid-20th century. He has been a professor of linguistics at the University of Toronto since receiving his a Ph.D. from the University of Alberta in 1970. He has also been a visiting professor at many universities worldwide, including Hong Kong University, University of Szeged, Hungary, University of Kiel in Germany,  Canterbury University in New Zealand, the University of Reading and the University of York in the UK. He is  the author of the website Dialect Topography, which compiles information about dialectal variation in the Golden Horseshoe region of Ontario, Canada.

Chambers has also written extensively on jazz, including such figures as Miles Davis and Duke Ellington.

Bibliography
His works include:

 1975 Canadian English: Origins and Structures
 1979 The Languages of Canada
 1983 Milestones I: The Music and Times of Miles Davis to 1960
 1985 Milestones II: The Music and Times of Miles Davis since 1960
 1991 Dialects of English: Studies in Grammatical Variation (with Peter Trudgill)
 1998 Dialects and Accents (with David Britain)
 1998 Dialectology (with Peter Trudgill)
 2002 The Handbook of Language Variation and Change (with Peter Trudgill and Natalie Schilling-Estes)
 2003 Sociolinguistic Theory: Linguistic Variation and Its Social Significance. Third, revised edition (first ed. published in 1995)

See also
Linguistic marketplace

References

External links
 
 Jack Chambers' Homepage
  Dialect Topography
John Kenneth (Jack) Chambers archival papers held at the University of Toronto Archives and Records Management Services

Other notable Canadian dialectologists 
 Walter S. Avis
 Charles Boberg
 Sali Tagliamonte
 Sandra Clarke
 Robert J. Gregg

1938 births
Living people
Linguists from Canada
People from Grimsby, Ontario
Sociolinguists
Academic staff of the University of Toronto
Academics of the University of York